There are two municipalities called Sainte-Jeanne-d'Arc in Quebec:
Sainte-Jeanne-d'Arc, Saguenay–Lac-Saint-Jean, Quebec, in Maria-Chapdelaine Regional County Municipality
Sainte-Jeanne-d'Arc, Bas-Saint-Laurent, Quebec, in La Mitis Regional County Municipality